Schärding-Suben Airport is a private use airport located  south of Schärding, Upper Austria, Austria.

See also
List of airports in Austria

References

External links 
 Airport record for Schärding-Suben Airport at Landings.com

Airports in Austria
Upper Austria